The Men's team Nordic combined competition for the 2002 Winter Olympics was held in Park City & Soldier Hollow, United States. The ski jumping part took place on February 16, and the cross-country race on February 17.

Results

Ski Jumping

Each of the four team members, performed two jumps, which were judged in the same fashion as the Olympic ski jumping competition. The scores for all the jumps each team took were summed, and used to calculate their deficit in the cross-country race. Each one point behind the leading score of Finland was equivalent to about one and a half seconds of time deficit.

Cross-Country

References

Nordic combined at the 2002 Winter Olympics